Richard Lawley (by 1515 – 1569), of Spoonhill and Much Wenlock, Shropshire, was an English Member of Parliament.

He was a Member (MP) of the Parliament of England for Much Wenlock in 1545 and 1547.

References

16th-century births
1569 deaths
16th-century English people
People from Much Wenlock
People of the Tudor period
Members of the Parliament of England (pre-1707)